The Fendermen were an American pop/rockabilly duo, composed of Jim Sundquist and Phil Humphrey, active in the early 1960s.

Jim Sundquist (lead guitarist; born James D. Sundquist, November 26, 1937, Niagara, Wisconsin; later settled in Minnesota) and Phil Humphrey (rhythm guitarist; from Milwaukee, Wisconsin). At this point, Humphrey lived in Stoughton, Wisconsin with his wife and daughter.

Sundquist and Humphrey, both born on November 26, 1937, met as students at the University of Wisconsin–Madison in the late 1950s under the direction of music store owner William Dreger, also deceased. William was the owner of Middleton Music store in Middleton Wisconsin. The duo had one hit single, "Mule Skinner Blues", released in 1960 on the Cuca Records label which was picked up for national distribution by Soma Records. The song was originally recorded in the basement of Middleton Music on an aluminum disc. The song hit No. 5 on the Billboard Hot 100, No. 32 in the UK Singles Chart in September 1960, and No. 2 in Canada.

The duo called themselves "the Fendermen" because they played Fender guitars (a Telecaster and a Stratocaster), and they connected them both to the same amplifier. These guitars were the only instruments used in the recording of "Mule Skinner Blues". The Fendermen toured with Johnny Cash and many others on the road across the US. William Herbert Dreger was the original producer for the Fendermen and was later replaced due to a dispute amongst the group. He was responsible  for helping the two man group get off the ground and onto charts where they were praised for their prowess for their music. William Dreger was also responsible for the ending of the song " Mule Skinner Blues " in which the group could not come up with a viable way to end the song. Thus the ending was made one day when William said " Cha Cha Cha " and thus creating the ending to a wonderful folk song. William tried to keep in touch with the rest of the group but was never answered back, even though he kept track of them and watched them rise to stardom. He was never paid for work as producer for the group, and died on August 3, 2019. He kept the legacy of the Fendermen alive by telling people of the group and how they were formed. He kept the original copy of the album along with a copy of the Soma Records 45 and an LP 33 with the Fendermen and many others who hit the top 10 in 1960. The Fendermen sat at the No.3 spot at Johnny Rockets in Greenville, South Carolina for many years before being removed and the restaurant being shut down. 

Sundquist died on June 4, 2013, of cancer at his home in Fairfax, Minnesota, at age 75.  Humphrey died on March 29, 2016, at a Minnesota hospital, at age 78, due to heart failure.

Discography

Albums

Singles

References

External links
A discography with sound checks
Blackcat Rockabilly Entry
A history - Home Design | Furniture | Lighting | Decoration website.
"Torture", pre-surf instrumental, unknown date, LISTEN

Rockabilly music groups
Rock music duos
American musical duos
Rock music groups from Wisconsin